Atsumari (translates as "collection", "meeting", or "cluster") is a binary-determination puzzle that was originally developed by Quadratic Games for the iPhone platform.  The puzzle is played on a hexagonal grid.  A rectangular board shape is standard but variations to the board shape can be part of the puzzle design.  The puzzle starts with a subset of the hexagonal cells containing a number greater than or equal to zero.  The solution to the puzzle is a unique pattern of black/white hexagonal cells that does not violate any of the puzzle rules.

Rules

 Each cell containing a non-zero number is considered white and must be part of an edge-connected cluster of exactly that many white cells (including the numbered cell).  The white clusters are enclosed by black cells or the edge of the board.  Thus, a cell containing a '1' must be enclosed by black cells and/or the game board, a cell containing a '2' must have one edge-connected neighboring white cell, etc.  White clusters cannot contain more than one number.
 A cell containing the number '0' is considered black.
 The black cells of the board (including the 0-cells) must form a single edge-connected cluster.
 A black cell cannot be surrounded by black cells.  This is equivalent to saying that the black 7-cell hexagon shape is not allowed.

Related puzzles

Atsumari is similar to the puzzle Nurikabe (based on a square grid) published by Nikoli.

Logic puzzles
Puzzle video games